The Florida Stingrays were an amateur football team in the American Indoor Football Association and United Football Federation of America. They were once a 2008 expansion team of the American Indoor Football Association, where they played their home games at the Lee County Civic Center.

2008 Season
The Stingrays were the only winless team in the AIFA in 2008. After the season, the majority owner of the team left, and the team suspended operations.

2012 Season
The Florida Stingrays were scheduled to play in 2012 at Germain Arena but hoped to play at Lee County Civic Center for the Southern Indoor Football League. Instead, they became an amateur team and joined the Southern Amateur Football Association.

Season-By-Season

|-
| colspan="6" style="text-align:center;"| Florida Stingrays (AIFA)
|-
|2008 || 0 || 14 || 0 || 4th WC Southern || --
|-
|2009 || -- || -- || -- || -- || --
|-
|2010 || -- || -- || -- || -- || --
|-
|2011 || -- || -- || -- || -- || --
|-
| colspan="6" style="text-align:center;"| Florida Stingrays (SAFA)
|-
|2012 || 6 || 4 || 0 || 2nd South Division || Loss Quarterfinal (Gainesville Gators)

References

External links
Official website
Stingrays' 2008 Stats
News release announcing the team

American Indoor Football Association teams
American football teams in Florida
Sports in Fort Myers, Florida
2007 establishments in Florida
American football teams established in 2007